Lepidoblepharis sanctaemartae is a species of gecko, a lizard in the family Sphaerodactylidae. The species is found in southern Central America and northern South America.

Etymology
The specific name, sanctaemartae, refers to the Santa Marta Mountains (Sierra Nevada de Santa Marta) of Colombia, where the holotype was collected.

Geographic range
L. sanctaemartae is found in Colombia, Panama, and Venezuela.

Habitat

Reproduction
L. sanctaemartae is oviparous.

References

Further reading
Köhler G (2000). Reptilien und Amphibien Mittleamerikas. Band 1. Krokodile, Schildkröten, Echsen. Offenbach am Main, Germany: Herpeton Verlag. 158 pp. . (Lepidoblepharis sanctaemartae, p. 49). (in German).
Ruthven AG (1916). "A New Genus and Species of Lizard from Colombia, with Remarks on the Genus Pseudogonatodes ". Occasional Papers of the Museum of Zoology, University of Michigan (21): 1-3. ("Lathrogecko sanctae-martae [sic]", new species, pp. 2-3).
Ruthven AG (1928). "Notes on the Genus Lepidoblepharis (Peracca), with Description of a New Subspecies". Occ. Pap. Mus. Zool., Univ. Michigan (191): 1-3. (Lepidoblepharis sanctaemartae fugax, new subspecies).

Lepidoblepharis
Reptiles described in 1916